Alonzo Wright (April 28, 1821 – January 7, 1894) was a Canadian member of Parliament and businessman commonly known as "King of the Gatineau".

He was born in Hull, Quebec in 1821. He was a grandson of Philemon Wright, and son of Tiberius Wright.  He earned his fortune in the family's lumber business.

In 1848, he married Mary Sparks, who was the daughter of Nicholas Sparks and Sarah Olmstead Wright, the widow of his uncle.

In 1863, he was elected in the County of Ottawa riding of Canada East to the Legislative Assembly of the Province of Canada. He continued to represent this district until 1891, after 1867 as a member of the House of Commons of Canada.

He died in 1894 at Ironside, Quebec, now part of the city of Gatineau.

The Alonzo-Wright Bridge over the Gatineau River was named after him. Although Wright wasn't involved in the construction of this bridge, he did have a role in petitioning for the replacement of the ferry service at this location by a bridge. His original homestead became the Collège Saint-Alexandre. According to the current owners, the log cabin now located at 893 av. Gatineau, known locally as the "Little Red House" built by Alonzo's father, Tiberius, served as the family residence in the 1830s. It dates from as early as 1824, possibly making it the oldest building in the Outaouais region in Quebec.

Electoral record

External links
 
 
 

1821 births
1894 deaths
Pre-Confederation Canadian businesspeople
Pre-Confederation Quebec people
Businesspeople from Quebec
Canadian people of English descent
History of Gatineau
Politicians from Gatineau
Conservative Party of Canada (1867–1942) MPs
Members of the House of Commons of Canada from Quebec
Members of the Legislative Assembly of the Province of Canada from Canada East
Anglophone Quebec people
Canadian people of American descent